Cabramurra was the third-highest permanently inhabited town on the Australian continent, situated at  in the western Snowy Mountains (or South West Slopes) of the Great Dividing Range, in the state of New South Wales. It is  lower than Dinner Plain in Victoria, and  lower than Charlotte Pass Village in New South Wales. The last residents are scheduled to leave the town in January 2018 with the current workforce housed being replaced with drive-in/drive-out staff. The name Cabramurra may be derived from Wiradjuri gambirra marra ("crooked hand").

History

Cabramurra was established in 1954 using prefabricated houses, as part of the Snowy Mountains Scheme and associated Snowy Mountains Hydro-Electric Scheme. An earlier surveying camp had been established there in 1951. The town was moved some 500m and 20m vertically to a more sheltered position, its current site, in 1974, leaving the original site as the lookout. The original houses were either demolished or relocated to Talbingo, Adaminaby and Jindabyne. The new houses were built with Besser blocks to a design specifically tailored to the environment. Long steep roofs allow snow to slide off, and the interiors are designed around a central heater (originally fuelled by oil) which warms all rooms in the house either directly or indirectly (chimney passes between upstairs bedrooms). All power and phone lines are routed underground.

In early January 2020 the town was damaged by fire during the 2019–20 Australian bushfire season. In the town itself a "significant number" of houses and buildings were lost, plus the school and old ski club.

Present status

Cabramurra is a 'company town', being the place of residence for workers in the nearby Tumut 1 and Tumut 2 power stations and electrical switching yards, and Tumut Pondage dam. Only persons directly employed by Snowy Hydro, and their families, are permitted to live in the town.

The town has 45 houses, 100+ units, a general store and petrol station, primary school, wet canteen (pub) (tavern), indoor swimming pool, single 'Poma' tow downhill ski slope, and tennis courts. The nearest small town for other shopping is Adaminaby; the nearest large towns/cities (that is, with a hospital) are Canberra, Tumut and Cooma. Emergency evacuation can be conducted by helicopter.

The primary school has one classroom, with one teacher taking all the children. The nearest high schools are at Tumbarumba and Cooma but only Tumbarumba is served by a daily bus service.

The short Snowy Hydro airstrip on the plateau above the town is often used by military aircraft practising short landing/takeoff exercises. The town's water supply is close to this airstrip and is known as "Dry Dam", on the dirt road that goes to Kiandra via "Kings Cross" and the Selwyn Snowfields day-only ski resort.

In winter, unlike the vast majority of Australia, the town can be covered by snow for 3–4 months. This has dictated the building design with a very highly pitched roof for the houses. The town's downhill ski run was the first in Australia to have lighting installed to allow night use.

The town is located within the boundaries of Kosciuszko National Park, on the road between Kiandra on the Snowy Mountains Highway to the north and Khancoban, another hydro-electric power site, to the south. The road is kept open to and beyond Kiandra by snow plough during winter, also serving the Selwyn Snowfields. The road south of Tumut Pond Dam is closed to traffic.

The permanent workforce of the settlement is currently being replaced with drive-in/drive-out staff, however the school will remain open to service surrounding areas.

Climate
Cabramurra has a subalpine climate (IBRA 1,400–1,800 m) with cool summers and cold, very snowy winters. In terms of precipitation, Cabramurra is a very wet climate during the cooler months, but still retains significant sunshine hours due to its summer dry-season. Under the Köppen classification, the town has a cold oceanic climate (Cfb).

Owing to the town's exposed position, perched over the western escarpment of the ranges, temperature inversion alone is insufficient for low minima as the coldest air drains into the valleys and plains; giving Cabramurra much milder minimum temperatures than surrounding areas, such as nearby Kiandra. Cabramurra instead requires the presence of a heavy snow pack to get very low temperatures, and often the low temperatures are attained during stormy weather. The town is usually snow-bound from June to September, as it lay well above the snow line. Cabramurra receives an average of 53.2 snowy days annually.

Gallery

See also 
 Snowy Scheme Museum
 Skiing in New South Wales
 Skiing in Australia

References

External links 

Company towns in Australia
Towns in New South Wales
Snowy Mountains Scheme
Ski areas and resorts in New South Wales
Snowy Valleys Council
1954 establishments in Australia